The Men's lightweight is a competition featured at the 2011 World Taekwondo Championships, and was held at the Gyeongju Gymnasium in Gyeongju, South Korea on May 4 and May 5. Lightweights were limited to a maximum of 74 kilograms in body mass.

Medalists

Results
Legend
DQ — Won by disqualification
W — Won by withdrawal

Finals

Top half

Section 1

Section 2

Section 3

Section 4

Bottom half

Section 5

Section 6

Section 7

Section 8

References
Draw
Draw

Men's 74